Nasreddine Nabi (born 1965) is a Tunisian football manager. He was named as Young Africans manager in April 2021.

References

1965 births
Living people
Tunisian football managers
Al-Ahly SC (Benghazi) managers
Al-Hilal Club (Omdurman) managers
Ismaily SC managers
Al-Merrikh SC managers
Young Africans S.C. managers
Tunisian expatriate football managers
Expatriate football managers in Sudan
Expatriate football managers in Egypt
Tunisian expatriate sportspeople in Egypt
Expatriate football managers in Tanzania